Lake Paradise is a reservoir on the Little Wabash River in Coles County, Illinois, United States. The community of Paradise is located near the lake's southern shore. The Little Wabash River was dammed to create the lake in 1929.

External links
 

Protected areas of Coles County, Illinois
Paradise
Bodies of water of Coles County, Illinois
1929 establishments in Illinois